The 2020–21 Marist Red Foxes men's basketball team represented Marist College in the 2020–21 NCAA Division I men's basketball season. The Red Foxes, led by third-year head coach John Dunne, played their home games at the McCann Arena in Poughkeepsie, New York as members of the Metro Atlantic Athletic Conference. 

They finished the season 12–9, 10–8 in MAAC play to finish in a tie for third place. As the No. 4 seed in the MAAC tournament, they lost in the quarterfinals to No. 5 seed Niagara 62–67. This marked the first overall and conference winning season for the Red Foxes since 2007–08 when they finished 18–14 overall, and 11–7 in the MAAC.

Previous season

The Red Foxes finished the 2019–20 season 7–23 overall, 6–14 in MAAC play to finish in last place. As the No. 11 seed in the 2020 MAAC tournament, they were defeated by No. 6 seed Niagara in the first round 54–56. The tournament, and all postseason tournaments, were eventually cancelled amid the COVID-19 pandemic.

Roster

Schedule and results

|-
!colspan=9 style="background:#B31B1B; color:#FFFFFF;"| Non-conference regular season

|-
!colspan=9 style="background:#B31B1B; color:#FFFFFF;"| MAAC regular season

|-
!colspan=12 style="background:#B31B1B; color:#FFFFFF;"| MAAC tournament
|-

|-

Awards
Following the season, two Marist players were selected to the All-MAAC rookie team, freshman guards Hakim Byrd and Ricardo Wright. Byrd averaged 8.4 points per game and shot 83.7% from the free-throw line while playing in all 21 games, starting nine of them. Wright, who played all 21 games and started 17, led Marist in scoring average (11.0), minutes played per game (28.9), and shot 75% from the free-throw line.

Statistics

Players

MAAC Leaders
Scoring
Ricardo Wright (11.0/game): 23rd

Rebounding
Jordan Jones (5.4/game): 21st
Victor Enoh (5.1/game): 25th

Field Goal Percentage (minimum avg 5 attempted per game)
Jordan Jones (78–132 .591): 3rd
Braden Bell (57–140 .407): 24th

Assists Per Game
Raheim Sullivan (3.0/game): 8th
Hakim Byrd (1.9/game): 24th

Steals Per Game
Raheim Sullivan (0.9/game): 24th

3-Point Field Goal Percentage (minimum avg 2 attempted per game)
Javon Cooley (17–47 .362): 16th

3-Point Field Goals Made
Ricardo Wright (34): 12th
Braden Bell (24): 21st
Hakim Byrd (23): 22nd

Blocked Shots
Jordan Jones (40): 3rd
Victor Enoh (12): 16th
Braden Bell (9): 23rd

Assist/Turnover Ratio (minimum 3 assists/game)
Raheim Sullivan (1.3): 6th

Offensive Rebounds
Jordan Jones (39): 10th
Victor Enoh (25): 25th

Minutes Played
Ricardo Wright (28.9/game): 19th
Raheim Sullivan (28.6/game): 24th

To qualify, players must have appeared in 75% of team's games.

References

Marist Red Foxes men's basketball seasons
Marist Red Foxes
Marist Red Foxes men's basketball
Marist Red Foxes men's basketball